Anegam  (O'odham) name translates as "Desert Willow", is a populated place and census-designated place (CDP), situated on the Tohono O'odham Indian Reservation, in Pima County, Arizona, United States. Its population was 151 as of the 2010 census, and 154 as of July 1, 2015.

Demographics

The population of Anegam was 35 in the 1960 census. 

Anegam appeared on the 2010 U.S. Census as a census-designated place (CDP), with 151 residents.

References

Populated places in Pima County, Arizona
Tohono O'odham Nation
Census-designated places in Pima County, Arizona
Populated places in the Sonoran Desert